Mecyna atlanticum is a species of moth in the family Crambidae. It is found on the Canary Islands and Madeira.

The wingspan is about 33 mm. The forewings are pale ochreous grey with two small dark grey dots and one bigger spot. The hindwings are darker grey with a dark grey border.

References

Moths described in 1894
Spilomelinae
Insects of the Canary Islands
Arthropods of Madeira
Moths of Africa